bxd or BXD may refer to:

The bithoraxoid gene,  bxd
The ticker symbol for the CBOE DJIA BuyWrite Index (BXD)
Bade Airport in Indonesia
BXD, a planned line on the Luas light rail system in Dublin, Ireland
Buxted railway station in south east England
BXD, former subsidiary of Drecom, Ltd., which was purchased by Bandai Namco Entertainment in 2020 and renamed to Bandai Namco Nexus